The 1997 NCAA Division I women's volleyball tournament began with 56 teams and ended on December 20, 1997, when Stanford defeated Penn State 3 games to 2 in the NCAA championship match.

Stanford won their second straight title and 4th in 6 years. After winning the first two games 15-10, 15-6, Penn State forced a fifth game as the Nittany Lions won the next two 15-2, 17-15. In the decisive fifth game, Stanford jumped out to the 12-8 lead before Kristin Folkl recorded the final three kills for the 15-9 win. Stanford finished the year 33-2, with their only two losses coming from Penn State in the early season.

The 1997 NCAA tournament was the first, and would be the last, year with 56 tournament teams, as it was expanded from 48 teams (1993-1996). In 1998, the tournament would be expanded to its present-day 64 tournament teams.

Play-in games

Records

Brackets

East Regional - University Park, PA

Central Regional - Madison, WI

Pacific Regional - Long Beach, CA

Mountain Regional - Stanford, CA

Final Four - Spokane Arena, Spokane, Washington

See also
NCAA Women's Volleyball Championship

References

NCAA Women's Volleyball Championship
NCAA
Volleyball in Washington (state)
1997 in sports in Washington (state)
December 1997 sports events in the United States
Sports competitions in Washington (state)